Jamais deux sans toi...t (French for "Never two without you/roof") is a French sitcom which was broadcast in 1996 and 1997.

Guest
 Pascale Roberts : Margot (5 Episodes)
 Franck de la Personne : Didier Sacha (3 Episodes)

External links
IMDb link

1996 French television series debuts
1997 French television series endings
French television sitcoms
1990s French television series